Jernigan  is an unincorporated community in Russell County, Alabama, United States.

History
A post office operated under the name Jernigan from 1876 to 1907.

Jernigan was planned to be the southern terminus of a proposed branch of the Alabama, Georgia, and Florida Railway.

References

Unincorporated communities in Russell County, Alabama
Unincorporated communities in Alabama